The following lists some of the events from the year 2015 in Russia.

Incumbents
President of Russia: Vladimir Putin
Prime Minister of Russia: Dmitry Medvedev

Events

January
 1 January – Musa Zavgaev, known as Emir of the Nadterechny and Naursky Districts of Chechnya, and his accomplice, Bashir Omarov, were killed during a special operation in the outskirts of the village of Mekenskaya, Naursky District of Chechnya. Both of them had directly involved in organizing the 4 December assault on Grozny.
 3 January – An image of a BPM-97 apparently inside Ukraine, in Luhansk, appeared to deliver further evidence of a Russian military presence there.
 9 January – Russia bans transsexual and transgender individuals from obtaining driving licenses.
 12 January – A controversial drama film, Leviathan, directed by Andrey Zvyagintsev wins the Best Foreign Language Film award at the 72nd Golden Globe Awards.
 13 January
 The Islamic State releases a video of a young boy gunning down two alleged Russian FSB agents captured by the militants.
 War in Donbass:
 A passenger bus has been shelled near Volnovakha south of the city of Donetsk, killing 12 and wounding 18 civilians. The Ukrainian authorities accused Russia and its backed separatists for the incident.
 Mass protests in Armenia have taken place near the Russian consulate and the Russian 102nd Military Base after a Russian soldier brutally murdered a local family of seven, including a two-year-old and a 6-month-old.
 15 January
 Russian financial crisis:
  One US dollar equals 66 Russian rubles. Moody's Investors Service has downgraded Russia's government bond rating to Baa3/Prime 3 (P-3) from Baa2/Prime 2 (P-2).

February
 27 February – Russian politician Boris Nemtsov was shot and killed in the center of Moscow.

March 
 7 March – Russian authorities arrest two men, Anzor Gubashev and Zaur Dadayev, suspects from the rebellious North Caucasus region, according to Russian state media reports, relying on a statement from the Federal Security Service Director Alexander Bortnikov. However, Nemtsov's daughter, Zhanna Nemtsova, speaking from Germany, says she has no idea who they are. Many still suspect Russian governmental involvement in his death.
 11 March – A fire in the shopping center Admiral in Kazan kills 17 people and injures 55.
 15 March – The documentary film Crimea. The Way Home is released on Rossiya 1 and on YouTube.

April
 2 April – The Russian-flagged fishing trawler Dalniy Vostok sinks off the Kamchatka Peninsula in the Sea of Okhotsk, killing 56 of its 132 crew. Sixty-three people have been rescued by other fishing vessels, while 12 are still missing.
 4 April – Twenty-six workers of the Vostochny Cosmodrome have begun a hunger strike, joining over 100 laborers protesting delayed wage payments since 24 March.

May
 9 May - Russia's 2015 Victory Day Parade was held on Red Square in Moscow, to celebrate the 70th anniversary of the defeat of Nazi Germany in the Great Patriotic War in 1945. Over 10,000 troops of the Russian Armed Forces and 1,300 troops from 10 foreign countries were also on parade, including contingents from nations in the Commonwealth of Independent States, as well as contingents from China, India, Serbia, and Mongolia participated in the parade.

June

July

August

September

October

November
 Russian Sukhoi Su-24 shootdown

Scheduled
2008-2015 Federal program is expected to end.

Sports
2015 World Aquatics Championships will take place from 24 July to 9 August.
2015 Bandy World Championship
2014–15 Russian Premier League
2014–15 Russian Bandy Super League

International sports competition
Russia will participate in many international athletic competitions: 2015 Men's World Ice Hockey Championships, 2015 IIHF World Championship, 2015 European Figure Skating Championships, 2015 FIFA Women's World Cup qualification – UEFA Group 1, and 2015 Rugby World Cup.

Deaths

January

 1 January – Boris Morukov, 64, physician and cosmonaut, STS-106 mission specialist.
 3 January – Olga Knyazeva, 60, fencer, Olympic champion (1976).
 10 January – Denis Tsygurov, 43, ice hockey player (Buffalo Sabres, Los Angeles Kings).
 12 January – Elena Obraztsova, 75, mezzo-soprano.
 15 January – Rimma Markova, 89, actress.
 17 January – Origa, 44, singer (Ghost in the Shell: Stand Alone Complex).
 23 January – Alexander Lastin, 38, chess grandmaster.

February

 1 February – Viktor Shekhovtsev, 74, footballer.
 9 February 
 Valeri Poluyanov, 71, footballer.
 Roman Sidorov, 59, footballer.
 15 February – Mikhail Koulakov, 82, abstract painter.
 16 February – Alexander Melentyev, 60, sport shooter, Olympic champion (1980).
 21 February – Aleksei Gubarev, 83, cosmonaut.
 23 February – Maria Golovnina, 34, journalist, Reuters bureau chief for Afghanistan and Pakistan.
 27 February – Boris Nemtsov, 55, politician, First Deputy Prime Minister (1997–1998), Deputy Prime Minister (1998).

July

 29 July – Liya Shakirova, 94, linguist and professor of pedagogical science

See also
List of Russian films of 2015
Russia at the 2015 European Games

References

External links

 
Russia
Russia
Russia
Years of the 21st century in Russia